Sung Ji-hyun (born 29 July 1991) is a South Korean badminton player from Seoul. She is an Asian Championship gold medalist, a two-time Summer Universiade gold medalist, and a World Championship bronze medalist. She was also part of South Korean teams that won the 2010 Uber Cup, 2017 Sudirman Cup, as well the team event at the 2013 and 2015 Summer Universiade. She competed at the 2010, 2014 and 2018 Asian Games, and at the 2012 and 2016 Summer Olympics. Sung is married to compatriot men's singles player, Son Wan-ho.

Early life and education 
Sung went into badminton following the path of her parents Sung Han-kook and Kim Yun-ja who both competed internationally in the 1980s.

Career 

She won the Korea Grand Prix Gold title in 2011. Unlike most South Korean badminton players Sung has focused on singles and in December 2011 she received a career high ranking of number seven in the world in that discipline.

In 2012, Sung's performances at Super Series event improved, and she reached semifinals in the Indonesia Open, Singapore Open and Japan Open. She was seeded 8th at the 2012 Olympics. However, she lost to Yip Pui Yin and did not make it past the group stage. She defended her Korea Grand Prix title at the end of the year.

Sung won her first Super Series Premier title early in 2013 at her hometown, at the Korea Open. This propelled her ranking up to world no.5, the highest of her career. Sung reached the semi finals at the All England, losing to eventual winner Tine Baun in a match that lasted for 76 minutes, with a final score of 22–24, 21–19, 19–21. She later won the 2013 Chinese Taipei Open Grand Prix Gold against Tai Tzu-ying, 21–16, 21–9. Then, she reached the finals of 2013 Denmark Super Series Premier losing to Wang Yihan in 21–16, 18–21, 20–22. In 2013 Korea Open Grand Prix Gold, she went up against compatriot Bae Youn-joo and she was beaten in 3 sets, 21–19, 15–21, 21–9.

At the 2014 German Open Grand Prix Gold, she reached the final which Sayaka Takahashi won, 21–17, 8–21, 21–12. At the 2014 Badminton Asia Championships, she became the first South Korean in 10 years to win the title, beating 1st seeded Wang Shixian 21–19, 21–15. At the 2014 Chinese Taipei Open Grand Prix Gold, she won 21–13, 21–18 against Liu Xin. She qualified for the Dubai 2014 BWF Super Series Masters Finals and lost to Tai Tzu-ying in the final, 17–21, 12–21.

She won the 2015 German Open Grand Prix Gold beating Carolina Marin 21–15, 14–21, 21–6. In 2017, she helped the South Korean national team to win the world team championships at the 2017 Sudirman Cup.

Achievements

BWF World Championships 
Women's singles

Asian Championships 
Women's singles

Summer Universiade 
Women's singles

BWF World Tour (1 title, 1 runner-up) 
The BWF World Tour, which was announced on 19 March 2017 and implemented in 2018, is a series of elite badminton tournaments sanctioned by the Badminton World Federation (BWF). The BWF World Tours are divided into levels of World Tour Finals, Super 1000, Super 750, Super 500, Super 300 (part of the HSBC World Tour), and the BWF Tour Super 100.

Women's singles

BWF Superseries (2 titles, 6 runners-up) 
The BWF Superseries, which was launched on 14 December 2006 and implemented in 2007, is a series of elite badminton tournaments, sanctioned by the Badminton World Federation (BWF). BWF Superseries levels are Superseries and Superseries Premier. A season of Superseries consists of twelve tournaments around the world that have been introduced since 2011. Successful players are invited to the Superseries Finals, which are held at the end of each year.

Women's singles

  BWF Superseries Finals tournament
  BWF Superseries Premier tournament
  BWF Superseries tournament

BWF Grand Prix (10 titles, 3 runners-up) 
The BWF Grand Prix had two levels, the BWF Grand Prix and Grand Prix Gold. It was a series of badminton tournaments sanctioned by the Badminton World Federation (BWF) which was held from 2007 to 2017.

Women's singles

  BWF Grand Prix Gold tournament
  BWF Grand Prix tournament

Record against selected opponents 
Record against year-end Finals finalists, World Championships semifinalists, and Olympic quarterfinalists. Accurate as of 21 January 2021.

References

External links 

 
 

1991 births
Living people
Badminton players from Seoul
South Korean female badminton players
Badminton players at the 2012 Summer Olympics
Badminton players at the 2016 Summer Olympics
Olympic badminton players of South Korea
Badminton players at the 2010 Asian Games
Badminton players at the 2014 Asian Games
Badminton players at the 2018 Asian Games
Asian Games silver medalists for South Korea
Asian Games bronze medalists for South Korea
Asian Games medalists in badminton
Medalists at the 2010 Asian Games
Medalists at the 2014 Asian Games
Universiade gold medalists for South Korea
Universiade medalists in badminton
Medalists at the 2013 Summer Universiade
Medalists at the 2015 Summer Universiade
21st-century South Korean women